Nikos Pourtoulidis (Greek: Νίκος Πουρτουλίδης; born 7 October 1983) is a Greek former professional footballer who played as a midfielder.

Career
Pourtoulidis signed for AEK in 2002, where he stayed for one and a half season. He only appeared for the club in 4 Greek Cup matches before he was loaned out to Thrasyvoulos. He stayed with Thrasyvoulos for two and a half years totalling 69 appearances and 13 goals. Pourtoulidis previously played for Asteras Tripolis in the Greek Super League. Pourtoulidis signed for Kalamata in 2008.

In June 2010 he signed an annual contract for Pierikos. Although he suffered a torn cruciate ligament ending the 2010–11 season, he signed a contract extension for one more year. On 27 August 2012 Pourtoulidis signed for Niki Volos. In 2013, he signed for Football League club Iraklis. He made his league debut for Iraklis in an away match against Kavala. He scored his first goal for the club to help the club achieve a 3–1 home win against Anagennisi Karditsa. For his performance in the season, he was named as Football League North Group's best player.

On 15 July 2016, he signed a year contract with Apollon Smyrni| for an undisclosed fee. On 30 January 2017, after the arrival of Christian Obodo, Portoulidis left the club on a mutual consent. A day later, he signed with Football League club OFI Crete F.C., aiming to help the club to be promoted in the Superleague Greece.

Honours
Asteras Tripolis
 Beta Ethniki: 2006–07

References

External links
Onsports Profile 
Myplayer.gr profile 

1983 births
Living people
Greek footballers
AEK Athens F.C. players
Thrasyvoulos F.C. players
Kalamata F.C. players
Asteras Tripolis F.C. players
Ilisiakos F.C. players
Pierikos F.C. players
Iraklis Thessaloniki F.C. players
Association football midfielders
Footballers from Kavala